Jassaniyeh may refer to:
 Jassaniyeh-ye Bozorg
 Jassaniyeh-ye Kuchek